This is a list of sea stacks in Scotland.

References 

Rocks